Gaston Vandermeerssche (August 18, 1921 – November 1, 2010) was a Belgian leader within the Dutch underground resistance against Nazi Germany during World War II. Vandermeerssche's life in France during World War II became the basis for a 1988 novel by Allan Mayer, which was later adapted into the 1997 Belgian film, Gaston's War.

Using the code name "Raymond", Vandermeerssche established an undercover smuggling line through the Pyrenees Mountains to deliver microfilmed intelligence from occupied France to the Belgian military headquarters in London.

Vandermeerssche emigrated to the United States and resided in 
Bayside, Wisconsin, where he died of natural causes on November 1, 2010, aged 89. He was survived by his wife, Violette, three daughters and one son.

References

1921 births
2010 deaths
Belgian resistance members
Dutch resistance members
Belgian emigrants to the United States
American people of Flemish descent
Place of birth missing
People from Bayside, Wisconsin